UTeach is a teacher certification program administered by the College of Natural Sciences and the College of Education at the University of Texas at Austin. It was created in 1997 to address both the shortage of qualified secondary mathematics, science, and computer science teachers as well as the quality of those entering the field.

The program has been well-received, cited by the National Academy of Sciences as a model program addressing the need for more highly qualified mathematics and science teachers.

UTeach has been a model for mathematics and science education programs at other institutions, and has been expanded to involve an additional forty-four universities in twenty-one states by 2019.

 2008-2012 (cohort 1)
 Florida State University
 Louisiana State University
 Northern Arizona University
 Temple University
 University of California, Berkeley
 University of California, Irvine
 University of Colorado Boulder
 University of Florida
 University of Houston
 University of Kansas
 University of North Texas
 University of Texas at Dallas
 Western Kentucky University
 2010-2014 (cohort 2)
 Cleveland State University
 Middle Tennessee State University
 University of Colorado Colorado Springs
 University of Memphis
 University of Tennessee, Chattanooga
 University of Tennessee, Knoxville
 University of Texas, Arlington
 University of Texas at Tyler
 2011-2015 (cohort 3)
 Columbus State University
 Southern Polytechnic State University
 University of Massachusetts, Lowell
 University of West Georgia
 2012-2016 (cohort 4)
 Boise State University
 Florida Institute of Technology
 Towson University
 University of Arkansas at Fayetteville
 University of Arkansas at Little Rock
 University of Central Arkansas
 University of Texas at Brownsville
 University of Texas, Pan American
 2013-2018 (cohort 5)
 Drexel University
 Florida International University
 University of Maryland, College Park
 Oklahoma State University
 Old Dominion University
 University of Alabama, Birmingham
 2015-2019 (cohort 6)
 George Washington University
 Louisiana Tech University
 University of Massachusetts, Boston
 University of Nevada, Reno  
 West Virginia University

References

External links
UTeach

Teacher training
University of Texas at Austin